Danit Peleg is a fashion designer based in Tel Aviv, which created the first commercially available, 3D-printed clothing, and was recognized by Forbes as one of Europe's Top 50 Women in Tech.

Education and career 

Danit Peleg studied Fashion Design at the Shenkar College of Engineering and Design. Her dissertation researched the possibility of 3D-printing clothes. In 2014, she designed her first 3D-printed jacket, the Liberte, after a lot of experimentation with different materials and setups. After this initial success, she created more designs to create a complete collection.

After graduating in 2015, she started her own studio, via which she provides custom, 3D-printed designs for clients.

In 2016, she designed a 3D-printed dress for Amy Purdy, who wore this dress during a dance performance during the opening ceremony of the paralympics of 2016.

In 2017, a limited edition-set of 100 Bomber jackets were created. For $1500 a piece, clients could get their own customized jacket printed.

Danit Peleg organized a three-day workshop on 3D-printed fashion in 2018, where 15 students from all over the world could learn about her design process. That year she was also recognized as one of Europe's 50 most influential woman in tech by Forbes. She was named as one of the BBC 100 Women in 2019.

References

External links
 Personal website

Israeli women fashion designers
Israeli fashion designers
Year of birth missing (living people)
Living people
BBC 100 Women